Abhishek Sharma may refer to:

 Abhishek Sharma (cricketer, born 1985), Indian cricketer
 Abhishek Sharma (cricketer, born 2000), Indian cricketer
 Abhishek Sharma (director), Indian film director and writer